The 2020 Supercoppa Italiana (branded as the PS5 Supercup for sponsorship reasons) was the 33rd edition of the Supercoppa Italiana, the Italian football super cup. It was played on 20 January 2021 for the first time at the Mapei Stadium – Città del Tricolore, Reggio Emilia, between Juventus, the winners of the 2019–20 Serie A championship, and Napoli, the winners of the 2019–20 Coppa Italia. 

Juventus won the match 2–0 and claimed their ninth Supercoppa Italiana title.

Background
Juventus made its ninth consecutive Supercoppa Italiana appearance, and 16th overall. They had a 4–4 record during this run, and were 8–7 overall. Napoli took part in the competition for the fourth time, having already participated as Serie A champions once (1990) and as Coppa Italia winners twice (2012, 2014). Napoli won two of the previous three editions in which they played. On all three occasions Juventus had been the opponent.

Match

Summary
Cristiano Ronaldo opened the scoring in the 64th minute when a corner from the left broke to him off the back of Napoli's Tiémoué Bakayoko, he finished to the net from six yards out. Napoli was awarded a penalty kick in the 80th minute, but with a chance to tie the game at 1–1, Lorenzo Insigne missed the net, wide to the left. Álvaro Morata made it 2–0 in the 5th minute of added time with a low shot to the net from the right, after Juan Cuadrado ran into the penalty area and drew goalkeeper David Ospina before passing to him.

Details

See also
 2019–20 Serie A
 2019–20 Coppa Italia

Notes

References 

2020
Juventus F.C. matches
S.S.C. Napoli matches
2020–21 in Italian football cups
January 2021 sports events in Italy